The Line is a 2022 drama film directed by Ursula Meier. It is a co-production between Switzerland, France and Belgium. The film explores a turbulent mother–daughter relationship and stars Stéphanie Blanchoud and Valeria Bruni Tedeschi. It had its world premiere on 11 February 2022 at the 72nd Berlin International Film Festival, where it competed for the Golden Bear.

Premise
After a violent argument with her mother, Margaret is subject to a restraining order before her trial: she is no longer allowed to make contact with her mother or approach within 100 metres of the family home for three months. Her younger stepsister Marion paints a physical line into the grass around the family home to mark this boundary. Every day, Margaret appears at this 100-metre threshold to see Marion and give her music lessons.

Release
The film was selected to compete for the Golden Bear in the main competition section of the 72nd Berlin International Film Festival, where the film had its world premiere on 11 February 2022. The film was released in France by Diaphana Distribution on 11 January 2023.

Cast

Reception
On Rotten Tomatoes, the film holds an approval rating of 63% based on 8 reviews, with an average rating of 5.7/10. According to Metacritic, which assigned a weighted average score of 62 out of 100 based on 4 critics, the film received "generally favorable reviews".

Peter Bradshaw of The Guardian gave the film four out of five stars, praising the lead performances of Blanchoud and Bruni-Tedeschi. Anna Smith of Deadline Hollywood called it an "arresting story of familial disharmony that's distinctive both visually and thematically." The Hollywood Reporters Jordan Mintzer praised the cast performance and direction, but lamented that the film "explores the tense and thorny nature of blood ties without ever delving into the psychology of it all, often leaving us in the dark as to why the characters behave the way they do." Varietys Peter Debruge deemed Blanchoud's performance to be the foundation of the film's impactfulness and praised the film's "downright radical" narrative for "[rejecting] aggression as an acceptable means of resolving problems".

Accolades

References

External links

 
 
 
 

2022 films
2022 drama films
2020s French-language films
Swiss drama films
French drama films
Belgian drama films
Films about mother–daughter relationships
Films directed by Ursula Meier
Arte France Cinéma films